Afro-Dominicans (also referred to as African-Dominicans or Black Dominicans) are Dominicans of predominant Black African ancestry. They are a minority in the country representing 7.8% of the Dominican Republic's population according to a census bureau survey in 2022. About 4.0% of the people surveyed claim an Afro-Caribbean immigrant background, while only 0.2% acknowledged Haitian descent. Currently there are many black illegal immigrants from Haiti, who are not included within the Afro-Dominican demographics as they are not legal citizens of the nation.

The first black people in the island were brought by European colonists as indentured workers from Spain and Portugal known as Ladinos. When the Spanish Crown outlawed the enslavement of Natives in the island with the Laws of Burgos, slaves from West Africa and Central Africa were imported from the 16th to 18th centuries due to labor demands. However, with the decline of the sugar industry in the colony the importation of slaves decreased. Many of these Africans eventually intermixed with the Europeans, Mestizos, and Natives creating a triracial Creole culture.

In the 19th and 20th centuries black immigrants from the French and British West Indies, as well as the United States came to the island and settled in coastal regions increasing the black population. The Afro-Dominican population can now be found in most parts of the country, from coastal areas such as San Cristobal and San Pedro de Macoris to deep inland areas such as Cotui and Monteplata. However, the southeast portion of the country and the border region have the highest concentrations of Black people in the country, while the central Cibao region has the lowest.

There is a lack of recent official data because the National Office of Statistics (ONE) has not released racial data since 1960, though the Central Electoral Board collected racial data until 2014. The 1996 electoral roll put the figures of "black" at 4.13% and "mulatto" at 2.3% of the adult population. The 1960 population census (the last one in which race was queried) placed it at 10.9%. According to a 2011 survey by Latinobarómetro, 26% of the people surveyed identified themselves as black.

History

16th - 18th century 

In 1502 (or 1503), the Spanish Crown finally acquiesced to the colonists' demands for enslaved Africans. The Santo Domingo colony, the only European possession yet in America, had already produced a devastating effect on the Taino, Lucayan (Arawaks), and Kalinga (Caribs) populations. A decade of intense exploitation and deadly waves of plagues had reduced the indigenous populations to levels that even the Spaniards considered dangerous. As the Hispaniolan Tainos (and Cigüayos) declined during the first couple of years of colonization, the colonial administration run by Christopher Columbus had gone against the wishes of Isabel I of Castile and had begun the first European slave trade on the western side of Atlantic. Raids that cleared out from Santo Domingo under the disguise of pacification and to evangelize nearby islanders had brought in other Amerindians to the colony. They were a large number of enslaved Lucayos from the Bahamas and Kalingas from the eastern islands. Now toiling alongside native Hispaniolans, these war captives became the first enslaved foreign workers on the island of Quisqueya, one of the indigenous names for the island that Columbus called Hispaniola.  By the turn of the century, not even the captured neighbors could supply the labor demands of the mines and plantations.  Rudimentary mining techniques and the always backbreaking mass-production of food-stuff required an ever-growing number of coerced workers. Expanding the colonization project to Puerto Rico and requesting the Crown permission to purchase enslaved Africans were the only two solutions colonists seemed capable of conceiving.  Ferdinand I of Aragon, widowed and freed from Isabel's more cautious hand, granted both wishes to the embattled colonists in the Indies.  It was never a liberal expansion nor an open trade, however. Though unrestrained by religious piety, Ferdinand, who was the ideal Prince in Machiavelli's imagination, was wary in the extreme of potential Conquistador-owned kingdoms (medieval style) in his new possessions, and of slave rebellions in the colonies.  So, the first group of enslaved Africans to arrive at the Ozama River were not Piezas de Indias purchased from the Portuguese traders, but a select group of seasoned Black Ladinos. They formed their own confraternities as early as 1502, and they are considered the first community of the African diaspora in the Americas. The profit too was meant to stay within his kingdom.  Indian resistances, flights, and diseases, however, forced the crown to open the market to thousands of bozales, enslaved Africans directly from the continent.

In 1521, the first major slave rebellion was led by 20 Senegalese Muslims of Wolof origin, in an ingenio (sugar factory) east of the Santo Domingo colony. Many of the insurgents fled to the mountains and established what would become the first autonomous African Maroon community in America. With the success of this revolt, slave revolts continued and leaders emerged among the African slaves, such as Sebastían Lemba. This also included people already baptized Christian by the Spanish, as was the case of Juan Vaquero, Diego de Guzmán and Diego del Campo. The rebellions and subsequent escapes led to the establishment of African communities in the southwest, north and east of the island, including the first communities of African ex-slaves in western Hispaniola that was Spanish administered until 1697, when it was sold to France and became Saint-Domingue (modern-day Haiti). This caused some concern among slaveholders and contributed to the Spanish emigration to other places. Even as sugarcane increased profitability in the island, the number of escaped Africans continued to rise, mixing with Taíno people of these regions, and by 1530, Maroon bands were considered dangerous to the Spanish colonists, who traveled in large armed groups outside the plantations and left the mountainous regions to the Maroons.

With the discovery of precious metals in South America, the Spanish abandoned their migration to the island of Hispaniola to emigrate to South America and Mexico in order to get rich, for they did not find much wealth there. Thus, they also abandoned the slave trade to the island, which led to the collapse of the colony into poverty. Still, during those years, slaves were used to build a cathedral that in time became the most oldest in the Americas. They build the monastery, first hospital and the Alcázar de Colón, and the Puerta de las Lamentaciones. In the 1540s, Spanish authorities ordered the African slaves building a wall to defend the city from attacks by pirates who ravaged the islands.

After 1700, with the arrival of new Spanish colonists, the Atlantic slave trade resumed. However, as industry moved from sugar to livestock, racial and caste divisions became less important, eventually leading to a blend of cultures—Spanish, African, and indigenous—which would form the basis of national identity for Dominicans. It is estimated that the population of the colony in 1777 was 400,000, of which 100,000 were Europeans and Criollos, 60,000 African, 100.000 mestizo, 60,000 zambo and 100,000 mulatto.

The abolition of slavery 
At the end of the eighteenth century, fugitive African slaves from Saint-Domingue, the western French colony of the island fled east to Santo Domingo and formed communities such as San Lorenzo de Los Mina, which is currently part of the "city" of Santo Domingo. Fugitives arrived from other parts of the West Indies as well, especially from the various islands of the Lesser Antilles.

By the late 1780s, free people of color in the island were inspired by the French Revolution to seek an expansion of their rights, while also involving enslaved Africans to fight for their cause.

In 1792, the Haitian revolutionary leader Toussaint Louverture was involved in a formal alliance between the black rebellion and the Spanish to fight against France. He ran fortified posts between rebel and colonial territory. Toussaint did not take part in the earliest stages of the rebellion, but after a few weeks he sent his family to safety in Spanish Santo Domingo and helped the overseers of the Breda plantation to leave the island.

Despite adhering to European royalist political views, Louverture used the language of freedom and equality associated with the French Revolution. From being willing to bargain for better conditions of slavery late in 1791, he had become committed to its complete abolition.

French commissioner, Léger-Félicité Sonthonax, proclaimed emancipation for all slaves in French Saint-Domingue, hoping to bring the black troops over to his side. In February 1794, the French revolutionary government officially proclaimed the abolition of slavery. Louverture had been in diplomatic contact with the French generals. During this time, competition between him and other rebel leaders was growing, and the Spanish had started to look with disfavor on his control of a strategically important region. In May 1794, when the decision of the French government became known in Saint-Domingue, Louverture switched allegiance from the Spanish to the French and rallied his troops to Lavaux.

In 1801, Louverture, abolished slavery in the eastern region of Santo Domingo, freeing about 40,000 enslaved persons, and prompting much of the planter of that part of the island to flee to Cuba and Puerto Rico. However, slavery was re-established in 1809 when the Spanish recovered the area. At the same time, the French governor Ferrand imported a second group of Haitian slaves to build the French colonial enclave Puerto Napoleon (Samana). 

Simultaneously, Ferrand rounded his troops to seize black children to sell into slavery. This action would infuriate and spark the wrath of Haiti's self proclaimed emperor, Jean-Jacques Dessalines. Realizing Ferrand's intention to restore slavery, Dessalines ordered an invasion of Santo Domingo in February 1805. He managed to reach the capital, but it was protected by a large wall, built back in 1540s by the Dominican slaves, thereby preventing Dessalines from laying his siege on the capital. However, after learning of a French ship believed to be heading towards Haiti to attack the country, Dessalines called off his invasion, and retreated through the Cibao, setting entire municipalities on fire, slaughtering many civilians he encountered, and committed numerous atrocities with no regards to race, sex or age. It is said that while Dessalines essentially targeted white and mixed-race residents, he extended his order to anyone not based on color or race, but by "sentiment." As a result, many black residents fell victim to the Haitian army. In addition, both black and mixed-race Dominicans were prohibited from leaving the island. In a church of Moca, two young girls, Maria and Nicolasa de Medina, were able to survive the massacre, but they had to witness their entire family be put to death by the invading army. From each city attacked, citizens were taken captive and forced to accompany the army back to Haiti, with many of them dying of hunger. Haitian soldiers raped the young girls and women, with some forced to serve as sex slaves. Upon their arrival in Haitian territory, these prisoners were either massacred in the streets, or forced on plantations. This massacre came to be known as the Beheadings of Moca. 

Slavery was again abolished in 1822 by the mulatto Haitian president Jean-Pierre Boyer, during the Haitian unification of Hispaniola which began in February of that year. However he maintained a system of indentured servitude, the Code Rural, on the Black Haitian majority.

In 1824, African American freed people began to arrive under the Haitian administered island, benefiting from the favorable pro-African immigration policy of Boyer since 1822, called the Haitian emigration. Called the Samaná Americans, they mostly settled in Puerto Plata Province and the Samaná Peninsula regions. Dominicans are mostly from West Africa and the country they are mostly from is Nigeria and Congo.

In 1838 Dominican nationalists Juan Pablo Duarte, Francisco del Rosario Sánchez, Matías Ramón Mella established the Trinitario movement.

Between the late nineteenth and early twentieth century, black laborers from the British West Indies came to work in the sugar plantations on the east of the island. Their descendants are known today by the name of Cocolos.

20th century
In 1920 the United States conducted a census in the country during its military occupation. The country was divided into 12 provinces and 63 cities and  towns. The most populated Dominican province was Santo Domingo with 146,652 inhabitants, and the least populated was Samaná with 16,915 inhabitants. The most populated city was Santiago with 72,150 inhabitants, followed by La Vega with 58,466 and the capital city of Santo Domingo with 45,007 inhabitants; the least populated city was El Jovero (now Miches) with only 1,692 inhabitants.

The province with the highest proportion of blacks was San Pedro de Macorís with 40%, with half of those being of foreign origin. The provinces with the most immigrants were Monte Cristi and San Pedro de Macorís, with 11,256 and 10,145 foreigners, mostly from Haiti (97%) in the first province, and from the West Indies (56%), Haiti (20%) and Puerto Rico (17%), in the case of the latter. Proportionately, foreigners represented 26.3% of the population of San Pedro de Macorís and 16.8% of the population of Monte Cristi.

The towns with the highest proportion of blacks were Restauración with 74%, followed by La Victoria, and Villa Mella; those with the lowest proportion of blacks were Monción with only 4%, and Constanza, Altamira and Jarabacoa with 8% each. The towns with the highest proportion of mestizos were Constanza and Monción, with 73% and 71% percent, respectively; the towns with the lowest proportion of mestizos were Villa Rivas and Pimentel with 9% each. The towns with the highest proportion of whites was Pimentel with 73%, followed by Castillo, Gaspar Hernández, La Peña, Villa Rivas, San José de las Matas, Jánico, Esperanza, Baní and Santiago.

Origins of the slaves

The slave trade involved nearly all of Africa's west coast inhabitants to be forcibly taken to the new world.

Others African ethnic groups arrived to colonial Santo Domingo during the slavery's period were: Wolof (kidnapped from Senegal), Aja (also called Ararás in Santo Domingo and kidnapped from Dahomey, current Benin), Ambundu  (from the Kingdom of Ndongo, in north Angola), Bran (originating from Brong-Ahafo Region, west from Ghana), Fulbe, Kalabari (originating from slave port from Calabar, in Nigeria), Terranova (slaves bought probably in Porto-Novo, Benin), Zape (originating from Sierra Leone), Bambara and Biafada (this latter was originating from Guinea-Bissau) people.

The Wolof were kidnapped to Santo Domingo from Senegal in the first half of the sixteenth century, until the kidnapping of this ethnic group was prohibited after his rebellion in 1522. Many of the slaves were also Ajas, usually taken in Whydah, Benin. The Ajas arrived in Santo Domingo, were well known for having made religious brotherhoods, integrated exclusively for them, the San Cosme  and San Damian.

Demographics

Census
Black (colloq. Moreno) has historically been a part of the official racial classification system of the Dominican Republic. The census bureau decided to not use racial classification beginning with the 1970 census. The Dominican identity card (issued by the Junta Central Electoral) used to categorize people as yellow, white, Indian, and black. In 2011 the Junta planned to replace Indian with mulatto in a new ID card with biometric data that was under development, but in 2014 when it released the new ID card, it decided to just drop racial categorization, the old ID card expired on 10 January 2015. The Ministry of Public Works and Communications uses racial classification in the driver's license, the categories used being white, mestizo, mulatto, black, and yellow.

The National Institute of Statistics (INE) does not collect racial data since the Census of 1960. In that census, the ethnic features were obtained by direct observation of the people registered by the enumerator, without any questions asked. About 73% of the population was classified as mestizo (note that in the 1920, 1935, 1950 and 1960 censuses referred to mixed-race people as mestizo or mulatto), 16% was classified as white, and 11% was classified as black (1,795,000 of people). The Dominican Republic is one of the few countries in Latin America where the majority of the population is made up of multiracials of predominately European and African descent, with a lesser degree of Amerindian admixture.

There are also many Afro-communities that descend from post-colonial migrations, most notably the Samaná Americans and Cocolos. Samaná Americans from the Samaná Peninsula, are descendants, of freed slaves from the United States, who entered the country in 1824 when it was under Haitian rule, because of the favorable pro-African immigration policy of Haitian president Jean-Pierre Boyer, constitute the most sizable group of native English speakers in the Dominican Republic. Aware of its distinctive heritage, the community, whose singular culture distinguishes them from the rest of Dominicans, refers to itself as Samaná Americans, and is referred to by fellow Dominicans as "los americanos de Samaná". Another Afro-group is the called Cocolo, descendants of those who came to the island from the English-speaking islands in the eastern Caribbean to work in the sugar plantations in the eastern part of the island between the late nineteenth and early twentieth century, they have formed communities in San Pedro de Macorís and La Romana. Its largest population of Afro-people are of Haitian origin, which is also the largest immigrant community in the country and is numbered according to some estimates, to be more than 800,000 people.

The 1920 Census registered 8,305 West Indians born abroad (they and their descendants are known as Cocolos) and 28,258 Haitians; the 1935 Census registered almost 9,272 West Indians and 52,657 Haitians. The Haitian population decreased to 18,772 in the 1950 Census, as an aftermath of the Parsley Massacre.

Geographic distribution 
Though, African ancestry is common throughout the Dominican Republic, today it is more prevalent in eastern areas such as San Pedro de Macorís, La Romana, and the Samaná Peninsula, as well as along the Haitian border, particularly the southern parts of the border region; it is least prevalent in the Cibao Valley (especially within the Central Sierra region), and to a lesser extent, in some rural communities in El Seibo and La Altagracia provinces, and the western half of the National District as well. However, in the 19th and early 20th century, African ancestry was higher in the southwestern region than in the eastern region, due to the impact of the Afro-Antillean and Haitian immigration during the 20th century.

Dominicans of Haitian ancestry live scattered across the country, however, communities in the border provinces of Elías Piña and Independence where they predominate among the population, highlighting the presence of European football fields, a very popular sport in Haiti.

Geographic distribution of blacks in the country is often tied to history. Higher concentrations of Afro Dominicans, descended from African slaves bought to colonial Santo Domingo, are in the southeast plain, because that is where most of the slaves were in the Spanish side of the island, around Monte Plata, El Seibo, and Hato Mayor etc. This same region is where there is a high concentration of Haitian immigrants, working on sugarcane bateyes (plantations). Cocolos, blacks descended from immigrants from other Caribbean islands, especially the Lesser Antilles nations, often settled San Pedro and La Romana. Blacks descended from relocated American slaves, mostly settled Samana and Puerto Plata. Haitian immigrants also have a big presence in places with a lot of construction and tourist activity, larger cities and tourist towns like Punta Cana, as well as in the border region.

Cultural contributions 
African cultural remnants seen in the Dominican Republic in many different aspects, including music, dance, magic-religious beliefs, cuisine, economy, entertainment, motor habits, and language.

Music 

Perhaps the greatest influence of enslaved Africans is observed in music and dance. Such influence comes from the dances, that, like the calenda, practiced in the Dominican Republic, as elsewhere in America, from the early years of slavery. We must Father Labat, who toured the West Indies in the eighteenth century, a fairly thorough calenda.

This dance derives, according to research by the folklorist Fradique Lizardo, several Dominican popular rhythms. One of the most widespread is the Música de palos (Music of sticks), name that designates both the pace and the membranophones used. National Rhythms with obvious African imprint are sarandunga, Música de Gagá (Ganga's music, arrived from Haiti), Baile de Palos (dance of Sticks), Música de Congos (Music of Congos), Cantos de Hacha (Songs of axe), los congos, la jaiba (the crab), el chenche matriculado (the chenche enrolled), etc. The salve, which in the words of the U.S. ethnomusicologist Martha Davis, is the most typical of the traditional Dominican genres, has two styles: one distinctly Spanish, amétrico and antiphonal, and another polyrhythmic, strongly hybridized between the Spanish and African styles. Among African instruments are the los palos (the sticks), balsié, and the gallumba.

It is important to also mark other musical instruments Dominicans of African origin such as the Palo mayor (mainmast), the canoita, los timbales (present in the bachata, also called bongos), and the tambora (Key instrument in the merengue music, the Dominican national dance).

For his part, the Bachata is a hybrid of the bolero (especially the bolero rhythm) of the Dominican Republic with other musical influences of African origin and other musical styles like the son, the merengue and the chachachá.

On the other hand, there are also music genres Dominican widespread across the country, whose origin is uncertain, being considered of Spanish and African origin, depending on musicologists and historians. Such is the case of the merengue music. So, Luis Alberti, one of the musicians considered as fathers of merengue, thinks that the roots of this music genre are purely Spanish. F. Lizardo, Dominican folklorist, by contrast, thinks that this origin is in the Bara tribe of Madagascar, who came to the island in the eighteenth century and brought a dance called merengue that has spread throughout the Caribbean. A very similar pace, adds Lizardo, arrived today with the Yoruba of Dahomey. In the African polyrhythm was also the merengue. Also often linked to the origin of merengue a dance called URPA or UPA, a native of Havana and arrived in the Dominican Republic between 1838 and 1849. The dance sailed through the Caribbean coming to Puerto Rico where he was well received. One of the movements of this dance is called merengue which apparently is the way selected to call the dance, and came to the Dominican Republic where he evolved into the genre of merengue. However, the Cuban UPA is also a dance whose origin appears to be in West Africa. In fact, in early ls, despite its rise among the masses, the upper class did not accept the merengue for long, because apparently, their connection with African music. Another cause that weighed on the repudiation and attacks the merengue were literary texts that accompany it, usually risqué.

Dominican folk music is intimately tied to religious culture, and interpreted primarily in the  fiesta de santos (party of saints), also known, according to the area of the country, as velaciones (vigils), velas (candles) o noches de vela (sleepless nights). Other popular rhythms are of Spanish origin, such as the mangulina and the carabiné.

Fashion 
The first Afro-Dominican models featured on the cover of Vogue Mexico are Licett Morillo, Manuela Sánchez, Annibelis Baez and Ambar Cristal Zarzuela for the September 2019 edition.

Religion 
Although most black Dominicans are Roman Catholics, Protestants make up 21.3% of the population. Atypical magical-religious beliefs are practice among some black Dominicans. The most characteristic feature is the Dominican Vudú, which  relates directly to the magical activity but it's generally considered taboo in mainstream Dominican society.

Funeral rites contain many features of African descent that are shared with other American countries. A typical example is the baquiní o velorio del angelito.

Institutions and cuisine 
The economic field include various institutions of mutual aid, existing both in the fields and in the cities. In rural areas, these institutions are in the form of groups of farmers who come together to collaborate on certain agricultural tasks such as planting, clearing of forests, land preparation, etc. Are called juntas (boards) o convites and have similar characteristics to Haitian combite closely related to the dokpwe of the Fon people of Dahomey. These tasks are accompanied by songs and musical instruments that serve as encouragement and coordination at work. All board members are required to reciprocate the assistance and collaboration in the work of others. After the day is a festival that is the responsibility of the landowner.

Another institution of mutual aid, of African origin, is revolving credit system that goes by the name of St. corresponding to esusu and Yoruba. As in Nigeria and other parts of Afroamerica, the San is composed preferably female. It consists, as is well known, in the establishment of a common fund to which each participant's San, contributes with a sum monthly or weekly. Each partner receives, on a rotating basis, the total value of the box, starting with the organized.

Some Dominican cuisine and dishes containing some products of African origin. Among the former are the guandul, the ñame and the funde. Typical African dishes seem to be the mangú, prepared with green plantains and derivatives cocola kitchen, the fungí and the calalú. A common drink among the black slaves was the guarapo, made of sugar cane juice .

Buildings 
African slaves were forced to build a cathedral that in time became the oldest in America. They built their monastery, first hospital and the Alcázar de Colón. In the 1540s, the Spanish authorities ordered the African slaves to build a wall to defend the city from attacks by pirates who ravaged the islands. They also built the Puerta de las Lamentaciones (Gate of wailing).

Haitian diaspora

Overview 
Haiti is and has been more impoverished than the Dominican Republic. In 2003, 80% of all Haitians were poor (54% in extreme poverty) and 47.1% were illiterate. The country of ten million people has a fast-growing population, but over two-thirds of the jobs lack the formal workforce. Haiti's GDP per capita was $1,300 in 2008, or less than one-sixth of the Dominican figure. As a result, hundreds of thousands of Haitians have migrated to the Dominican Republic, with some estimates of 800,000 Haitians in the country, while others believe they are more than a million. Usually working in low paid and unskilled in building construction, household cleaning, and in plantations.

Children of illegal Haitian immigrants are often stateless and they are denied services, as their parents are denied Dominican nationality, and therefore are considered transient residents, due to their illegal status and undocumented, and children often have to choose only Haitian nationality.

A large number of Haitian women, often arriving with several health problems, cross the border to Dominican soil during their last weeks of pregnancy to obtain necessary medical care for childbirth, since Dominican public hospitals cannot deny medical services based on nationality or legal status. Statistics from a hospital in Santo Domingo report that over 22% of births are to Haitian mothers.

History 
During the wars with Haiti (1844–56), the government of this country developed a black centrism, a centrism that Dominicans strongly refused in favor of their Hispanic heritage. Historically, Haiti was more densely populated than the Dominican Republic. Due to the lack of free lands in Haiti, as land was held by a small group of landlords, Haitian peasants began to settle in the borderland region, within the Dominican Republic. Through the years, especially after 1899, the Haitian government claimed the territory populated by Haitians, and under a treaty in 1929 several towns and cities in Central Hispaniola officially became Haitian, comprising 4,572 km2. A Dominican census in 1935 revealed that 3.6% of the population was Haitian. In 1936, the Haitian government claimed more territory and the Dominican Republic ceded another 1,628 km2 to Haiti; the next year, the Dominican dictatorship ordered the Dominicanization of the border and conducted the Parsley Massacre.

In 1937, Trujillo, in an event known as the Masacre del Perejil (Parsley Massacre), ordered the Army to kill Haitians living on the border. The Army killed about 10,000 to 15,000 Haitians over six days, from the night of 2 October 1937, to 8 October 1937. To avoid leaving evidence of the Army's involvement, the soldiers used machetes instead of bullets. The soldiers of Trujillo interrogated anyone with dark skin, using the shibboleth "parsley" to differentiate Haitians from Afro-Dominicans when necessary, the "r" of parsley was difficult pronunciation for Haitians. As a result of the slaughter, the Dominican Republic agreed pay to Haiti the amount of $750,000, later reduced to $525,000. The genocide sought to be justified on the pretext of fearing infiltration, but was actually also a retaliation, commented on both in national currencies, as well as having been informed by the Military Intelligence Service (the dreaded SIM), the government Haitian cooperating with a plan that sought to overthrow Dominican exiles.

In 2005 Dominican President Leonel Fernández criticized collective expulsions of Haitians were "improperly and inhumane." After a delegation from the United Nations issued a preliminary report stating that it found a profound problem of racism and discrimination against people of Haitian origin, the Dominican Foreign Minister, Carlos Morales Troncoso, gave a formal statement saying "Our border with Haiti has its problems, this is our reality, and this must be understood. It's important not to confuse national sovereignty with indifference, and not to confuse security with xenophobia."

After the earthquake that struck Haiti in 2010, the number of Haitians doubled to 2 million, most of them illegally crossed after the border opened for international aid. Human Rights Watch estimated in 70,000 Haitian immigrants legal and 1,930,000 illegal living in Dominican Republic.

Notable people 

 Alejandro Balde - footballer
 Alberto Baldé - footballer
 Erick Japa - footballer
 Josefina Báez - actress
 Adrián Beltré - former MLB baseball player
 Robinson Canó - MLB baseball player
 Vladimir Guerrero - former MLB baseball player
 Joan Guzman - former professional boxer
 Ulises Heureaux - former president of the Dominican Republic
 Al Horford - NBA basketball player
 Sebastián Lemba - slave rebellion leader
 Pedro Martínez - former MLB baseball player
 Lineisy Montero - model
 Monkey Black - rapper
 David Ortiz - former MLB baseball player
 José Joaquín Puello - general and government minister
 Fernando Rodney - former MLB baseball player
 Antony Santos - musician
 Alfonso Soriano - former MLB baseball player
 Arlenis Sosa - model
 Sammy Sosa - former MLB baseball player
 Mamá Tingó - activist
 Johnny Ventura - musician, politician
 Ronaldo Vásquez - footballer
 Dorny Romero - footballer
 Joao Urbáez - footballer
 Junior Firpo - footballer
 Luiyi de Lucas - footballer
 Marco Luciano - MLB baseball player
 Peter González - footballer
 Fausto Rey - singer
 El Canario - singer
 Omega - singer

See also
 Cocolos
 Samaná Americans
 Haitians in the Dominican Republic
 Afro-Latin Americans
 Black Hispanic and Latino Americans
 Emancipados
 Dominican people
 Slavery in colonial Spanish America
 Atlantic slave trade
Racism in the Dominican Republic
 Mixed Dominicans

Notes

References

External links
Article on Dominican Palos music written by Dr Martha Ellen Davis at lameca.org
 ¿Es racista el pueblo dominicano? (Are the Dominican people racist?)

 
Ethnic groups in the Dominican Republic
Dominican Republic
Lists of Dominican Republic people